Eucalyptus moorei, commonly known as narrow-leaved sally, is a species of mallee that is endemic to New South Wales. It has smooth bark, linear to narrow lance-shaped or curved adult leaves, flower buds in groups of between seven and fifteen, white flowers and cup-shaped or shortened spherical fruit.

Description
Flowering occurs between February and May and the flowers are white.

Taxonomy and naming
Eucalyptus moorei was first formally described in 1905 by Joseph Maiden and Richard Hind Cambage from a specimen collected "on the highest parts of the Blue Mountains" and the description was published in Proceedings of the Linnean Society of New South Wales.

In 1999, Ian Brooker and David Kleinig described two subspecies of E. moorei, distinguished by the size and shape of their juvenile leaves, that have been accepted by the Australian Plant Census:

The National Herbarium of New South Wales lists Eucalyptus dissita K.D.Hill as a species separate from E. moorei and occurring only in the Gibraltar Range National Park the Australian Plant Census lists it as a synonym.

The specific epithet (moorei) honours Charles Moore and dissita is a Latin word meaning "apart" or "remote". The name serpentinicola refers to the unusual habit of this subspecies that only grows in hills of red soil over serpentinite.

Distribution and habitat
Narrow-leaved sally grows in sandy soil in heath, sometimes on poorly drained sites or on exposed sandstone. It is found in the Gibraltar Range, Blue Mountains, Tinderry Range and in the Wadbilliga National Park. Subspecies serpentinicola is only known from an area near Gloucester.

References 

Plants described in 1999
moorei
Myrtales of Australia
Flora of New South Wales
Mallees (habit)
Taxa named by Ian Brooker